Kyparissi is a small village along the north east coast of Laconia, Greece. It is part of the municipal unit of Zarakas. In recent years it has become famous as a rock climbing destination.

References

Populated places in Laconia
Monemvasia
Climbing areas of Greece